The men's vault competition was one of eight events for male competitors in artistic gymnastics at the 1988 Summer Olympics in Seoul. The qualification and final rounds took place on September 18, 20 and 24th at the Olympic Gymnastics Hall. There were 89 competitors from 23 nations, with nations competing in the team event having 6 gymnasts and other nations having up to 3 gymnasts. The event was won by Lou Yun of China, the second man to successfully defend an Olympic title in the vault and fourth man to win two medals of any color in the event. Sylvio Kroll of East Germany took the silver medal, while Park Jong-hoon of South Korea earned his nation's first men's vault medal with his bronze.

Background

This was the 17th appearance of the event, which is one of the five apparatus events held every time there were apparatus events at the Summer Olympics (no apparatus events were held in 1900, 1908, 1912, or 1920). Two of the eight finalists from 1984 returned, both of the Chinese finalists: gold medalist Lou Yun and one of the four silver medalists, Li Ning. Lou had finished second in the 1985 World Championships and shared gold with Sylvio Kroll of East Germany in the 1987 World Championships; the defending champion was heavily favored to repeat.

Chinese Taipei made its debut in the men's vault. The United States made its 15th appearance, most of any nation; the Americans had missed only the inaugural 1896 vault and the boycotted 1980 Games.

Competition format

The event used a "vaulting horse" aligned parallel to the gymnast's run (rather than the modern "vaulting table" in use since 2004). Each nation entered a team of six gymnasts or up to three individual gymnasts. All entrants in the gymnastics competitions performed both a compulsory exercise and a voluntary exercise for each apparatus. The scores for all 12 exercises were summed to give an individual all-around score. These exercise scores were also used for qualification for the apparatus finals. The two exercises (compulsory and voluntary) for each apparatus were summed to give an apparatus score. Half of the preliminary score carried over to the final. The 1984 Games had expanded the number of finalists from six to eight. Nations were still limited to two finalists each. Others were ranked 9th through 89th.

Schedule

All times are Korea Standard Time adjusted for daylight savings (UTC+10)

Results

Eighty-nine gymnasts competed in the vault event during the compulsory and optional rounds on September 18 and 20. The eight highest scoring gymnasts advanced to the final on September 24. Each country was limited to two competitors in the final. Half of the points earned by each gymnast during both the compulsory and optional rounds carried over to the final. This constitutes the "prelim" score.

References

Official Olympic Report
www.gymnasticsresults.com

Men's vault
Men's 1988
Men's events at the 1988 Summer Olympics